The 1895 Virginia Orange and Blue football team represented the University of Virginia as an independent during the 1895 college football season. Led by first-year head coach Harry Arista Mackey, the team went 9–3 and claims a Southern championship.

Schedule

*Virginia forfeited due to a major fire at UVA.

See also
 1895 College Football All-Southern Team

References

Virginia
Virginia Cavaliers football seasons
Virginia Orange and Blue football